Farías is a surname that may refer to:

César Farías, Venezuelan football manager
Ernesto Farías, Argentine professional footballer
Gómez Farías (disambiguation)
José Farías,  Argentine football player and manager
Julio Farías Cabello, Argentine rugby union player
Perla Farías, Venezuelan director, producer, screenwriter and executive
Rogelio Farías, Chilean football midfielder
Victor Farías, Chilean historian and author of communist literature
Alam Farias, Mexican - American Architect